The Origin is a 2022 British film directed by Andrew Cumming in his feature length debut and starring Safia Oakley-Green and Chuku Modu. The film was nominated for five awards at the 2023 British Independent Film Awards, winning best breakthrough performance for Oakley-Green. The film had its world premiere at the BFI London Film Festival on October 6, 2022.

Synopsis
45,000 years ago a stone-age community are trying to defend itself against a mysterious enemy.

Cast
 Safia Oakley-Green as Beyah
 Chuku Modu as Adem
 Kit Young as Geirr
 Iola Evans as Ave
 Luna Mwezi as Heron
 Arno Luening as Odal

Production
Speaking to Screen Daily in 2021, Cumming called the project “a paleolithic horror film”. He had first discussed the idea for the film with producer Oliver Kassman in 2015 and the pair invited Ruth Greenberg on board to script the project.

The film was produced by Kassman for Escape Plan and executive produced by David Kaplan and Sam Intili on behalf of Animal Kingdom. It was co-produced by Wendy Griffin of Selkie Productions. Financing came from Screen Scotland and the BFI, awarding funds from the National Lottery.

Principal photography took place during COVID-19 pandemic lockdown in November 2022 around Gairloch in Scotland. The production company hired out the Gairloch Hotel and all filming took place within a mile of the venue.

Release
The Origin had its world premiere at the BFI London Film Festival. The film has its Scotland premiere on March 5, 2023 as part of the 2023 Glasgow Film Festival.

Reception
On the review aggregator website Rotten Tomatoes, The Origin holds an approval rating of 83% based on 6 reviews.

Accolades
The film received multiple nominations at the British Independent Film Awards, including best debut director for Cumming, best    breakthrough for Oakley-Green, best music for Adam Janota Bzowski, best hair and make up for Niamh Morrison, and best debut screenplay for Ruth Greenberg. Safia Oakley-Green won the British Independent Film Award for Breakthrough Performance on the night.

References

External links

2020s English-language films
2020s British films
Films about cavemen
Films set in prehistoric Britain
Films shot in Scotland